The 2018–19 North Texas Mean Green women's basketball team represents the University of North Texas during the 2018–19 NCAA Division I women's basketball season. The Mean Green, led by fourth year head coach Jalie Mitchell, play their home games UNT Coliseum, also known as The Super Pit, and were members of Conference USA. They finished the season 18–16, 7–9 in C-USA play to finish in ninth place. They advanced to the quarterfinals of the C-USA women's tournament where they lost to Rice. They received an invitation of the WBI where they defeated Texas–Rio Grande Valley, Utah State and North Alabama in the first round, quarterfinals and semifinals to advanced to the championship game where they lost Appalachian State.

Roster

Schedule

|-
!colspan=9 style=| Exhibition

|-
!colspan=9 style=| Non-conference regular Season

|-
!colspan=9 style=| Conference USA regular Season

|-
!colspan=9 style=| Conference USA Women's Tournament

|-
!colspan=9 style=| WBI

See also
 2018–19 North Texas Mean Green men's basketball team

References

2017-18
2018–19 Conference USA women's basketball season
2018 in sports in Texas
2019 in sports in Texas
2019 Women's Basketball Invitational participants